Prasert na Nagara (21 March 1919 – 7 May 2019) was a Thai scholar. Best known for his studies of ancient Thai inscriptions, he was formally trained in engineering and statistics, subjects which he taught as a professor at Kasetsart University. He served as vice president at the university and as Permanent Secretary of the Ministry of University Affairs. His influential work in history, archaeology and linguistics include the history of the Sukhothai Kingdom as well as the structure of the Tai language family.

References

Prasert na Nagara
Prasert na Nagara
Prasert na Nagara
Prasert na Nagara
Prasert na Nagara
Prasert na Nagara
Prasert na Nagara
Prasert na Nagara
Prasert na Nagara
Men centenarians
1919 births
2019 deaths